Top of the Form is a 1953 British comedy film directed by John Paddy Carstairs and starring Ronald Shiner, Anthony Newley and Harry Fowler. The film draws inspiration from Will Hay's 1937 classic Good Morning, Boys. The film was released in black-and-white.

It was made at Pinewood Studios near London with sets designed by the art director Maurice Carter. The film earned billings of £143,000.

Plot summary
This story explores a bookmaker Ronnie Fortescue (Ronald Shiner), who becomes headmaster of a boys' school, and of his and his pupil's adventures in passing examinations and on a subsequent free trip to Paris. Once in Paris, headmaster and pupils become embroiled in gambling casinos, and in a plot to steal the French Crown Jewels.

Cast
Ronald Shiner as Professor Ronnie Fortescue
Anthony Newley as Percy
Harry Fowler as Albert
Jacqueline Pierreux as Yvette
Alfie Bass as Arty Jones
Mary Jerrold as Mrs. Bagshot
Richard Wattis as Willoughby Gore
Howard Marion-Crawford as Dickson
Roland Curram as Terence
Terence Mitchell as Clarence
Gerald Campion as Pugley
Oscar Quitak as Septimus
Kynaston Reeves as The Dean
Martin Benson as Cliquet
 Graham Stark as Wilson 
 Hal Osmond as Barber 
 Danny Green as Bookies thug
 Melvyn Hayes as Schoolboy with glasses
 Ronnie Corbett as 	Student 
 Ronan O'Casey as 	Brother
 Naomi Chance as Northern Woman On Station 
 Andreas Malandrinos as 	Museum Concierge

Critical reception
The Radio Times called it a "misfiring Ronald Shiner vehicle...Less amusing than (Will) Hay's St Michael's outings and less anarchic than the St Trinian's romps, this efficient but underwhelming caper is all too typical of its director, John Paddy Carstairs": whereas TV Guide hailed "An entertaining comedy."

References

External links
 
 
 

1953 films
British comedy films
Films directed by John Paddy Carstairs
1950s screwball comedy films
Films shot at Pinewood Studios
Films set in London
Films set in Paris
Remakes of British films
1950s high school films
1953 comedy films
Films with screenplays by Ted Willis, Baron Willis
Films with screenplays by John Paddy Carstairs
Films with screenplays by Patrick Kirwan
Films with screenplays by Sid Colin
British black-and-white films
Films produced by Paul Soskin
Films scored by Ronald Hanmer
1950s English-language films
1950s British films